Ledouxius is a genus of ground beetles in the family Carabidae. There are about six described species in Ledouxius.

Species
These six species belong to the genus Ledouxius:
 Ledouxius kaganensis (Heinz & Ledoux, 1987)  (Pakistan)
 Ledouxius longulus (Ledoux, 1984)  (India)
 Ledouxius meurguesae (Ledoux, 1984)  (India)
 Ledouxius microcephalus (Ledoux, 1984)  (India)
 Ledouxius oblongus (Ledoux, 1984)  (India)
 Ledouxius umbilicatus (Ledoux, 1984)  (India)

References

Carabidae